A Girl Like Me or Girl Like Me may refer to:

Film and television
 A Girl like Me (film), a 2005 American documentary short film by Kiri Davis
 A Girl Like Me: The Gwen Araujo Story, a 2006 American television film

Music

Albums
 A Girl Like Me (Emma Bunton album) or the title song, 2001
 A Girl like Me (Rihanna album) or the title song, 2006
 A Girl Like Me: Letters to My Lovers, an EP by Peppermint, or the title song, 2020
 A Girl like Me, by Nikkole, 2005

Songs
 Girl Like Me (Black Eyed Peas and Shakira song), 2020
 Girl Like Me (Jazmine Sullivan song), 2021
 Girl Like Me (Luv' song), 1990
 A Girl Like Me, by Christina Milian from Christina Milian, 2001
 A Girl Like Me, by The Desert Sessions from Volume 10: I Heart Disco, 2003
 Girl Like Me, by Jessie James Decker from Southern Girl City Lights, 2017

See also
 A Girl Like You (disambiguation)